Breakdown is the sixth album by singer-songwriter Melissa Etheridge, released in 1999 (see 1999 in music). A Limited Edition version of the album was simultaneously released featuring three bonus tracks.

"Scarecrow" is dedicated to the memory of Matthew Shepard, and his family and friends.

"Into the Dark" appeared in episodes of Haven and Night Visions.

Track listing
All songs by Melissa Etheridge, except where noted

"Breakdown" – 3:54
"Angels Would Fall" (Etheridge, Shanks) – 4:39
"Stronger Than Me" – 4:08
"Into the Dark" – 4:59
"Enough of Me" – 4:39
"Truth of the Heart" (Etheridge, Shanks) – 4:31
"Mama I'm Strange" – 4:29
"Scarecrow" – 5:21
"How Would I Know" – 4:15
"My Lover" – 5:45
"Sleep" – 7:10 [standard pressing] / 4:39 [Limited Edition pressing]
"Touch and Go"* – 4:36
"Cherry Avenue"* – 4:29
"Beloved"* – 7:54

* Limited Edition bonus tracks

Personnel
Melissa Etheridge – acoustic guitar, vocals
Kenny Aronoff – drums, marimba, shaker
Jon Brion – guitar
Mark Browne – bass guitar
Matt Chamberlain – drums
Steve Ferrone – percussion, drums
Rami Jaffee – keyboards
Jim Keltner – drums
Greg Leisz – guitar, mandolin, lap steel guitar
Brian MacLeod – percussion, drum loop
Pino Palladino – bass guitar
John Shanks – dulcimer, guitar, harp, marimba, background vocals
Patrick Warren – keyboards
Gota Yashiki – programming

Production
Producers: Melissa Etheridge, John Shanks
Engineers: Marc DeSisto, Greg Goldman
Assistant engineers: John Aguto, Tom Nellen, Geoff Walcha
Mixing: Bob Clearmountain, Tom Lord-Alge, Chris Lord-Alge
Mastering: Bob Ludwig
studio technician: Brett Allen
Art direction: Scott Denton Cardew
Artwork: Scott Denton Cardew
Photography: Barbara Green, Rocky Schenck
Hair stylist: Bernhard Tammé

Charts

Certifications

Notes 

Melissa Etheridge albums
1999 albums
Albums produced by John Shanks
Island Records albums